French toast is a dish of sliced bread soaked in beaten eggs and often milk or cream, then pan fried. Alternative names and variants include "eggy bread", "Bombay toast", "gypsy toast",  and "poor knights" (of Windsor).

When French toast is served as a sweet dish, sugar, vanilla, or cinnamon are also commonly added before pan-frying, and then it may be topped with sugar (often powdered sugar), butter, fruit, or syrup. When it is a savory dish, it is generally fried with a pinch of salt or pepper, and it can then be served with a sauce such as ketchup or mayonnaise.

History and terminology
The earliest known reference to French toast is in the Apicius, a collection of Latin recipes dating to the 1st century CE, where it is described as simply aliter dulcia 'another sweet dish.' The recipe says to "Break [slice] fine white bread, crust removed, into rather large pieces which soak in milk [and beaten eggs] fry in oil, cover with honey and serve".

A 14th-century German recipe uses the name Arme Ritter 'poor knights', a name also used in English and the Nordic languages. Also in the 14th-century, Taillevent presented a recipe for "tostées dorées". Italian 15th-century culinary expert Martino da Como offers a recipe.

The usual French name is pain perdu ( 'lost bread', reflecting its use of stale or otherwise "lost" bread. It may also be called pain doré 'golden bread' in Canada. There are fifteenth-century English recipes for pain perdu.

An Austrian and Bavarian term is pafese or pofese, from zuppa pavese, referring to Pavia, Italy. The word "soup" in the dish's name refers to bread soaked in a liquid, a sop. In Hungary, it is commonly called bundáskenyér (lit. "coated bread").

In Ottoman cuisine, a dish of bread soaked in eggs with honey but no milk is called fāvniyye.

Preparation

Slices of bread are soaked or dipped in a mixture of beaten eggs, often whisked with milk or cream. Sliced or artisan loaves cut to 3/4 to 1" thick are frequently used as the bread of choice. Sugar, cinnamon, nutmeg, and vanilla may be variously added to the mixture. The bread is then fried in butter or olive oil until browned and cooked through. Day-old bread is often used, both for its thrift and because it will soak up more egg mixture without falling apart.

The cooked slices may be served with sugar or sweet toppings such as caramel, ice cream, jam, honey, fruit, and/or maple syrup.

Variations
There are many variations. The dipping mixture might not include eggs; and the bread may be soaked in wine, rosewater, or orange juice, either before or after cooking.

International versions

Balkans
In Southern Slavic countries such as Serbia, Croatia,  Bosnia & Herzegovina, and Bulgaria it is called Prženice or "Pohani kruh". It is eaten sweet or savory and it paired with ajvar, jam, cheese, prosciutto, or sausage.

Brazil and Portugal

In both Portugal and Brazil, rabanadas are a traditional Christmas dessert. Many recipes often use Tinto or Port wine.

Denmark
In Denmark, Arme Riddere (Poor Knights) is a sweet breakfast dish that can also be eaten as an afternoon treat or evening dessert. The Danish version of this dish uses sugar with cinnamon instead of plain sugar.

France
In France, pain perdu has a wide range of regional variations.

Georgia
In Georgia it is known as kikliko. It is a popular dish for brunch or breakfast and is almost always served as a savory dish. Sometimes different kinds of cheese are also combined.

Germany
In Germany, Arme Ritter (Poor Knights) or Pofesen are at least known since the 14th century (mentioned in Deutsches Wörterbuch (The German Dictionary) by the Brothers Grimm).

Greece 
In Greece, it is known as Avgofetes (Greek: Αυγόφετες) or Avgopsomo (Greek: Αυγόψωμο). This dish is a breakfast or brunch staple that involves dipping bread in scrambled eggs and frying it. It's a widely recognized and popular culinary preparation that is commonly consumed as either breakfast or brunch. It can be enjoyed in either a savory or sweet flavor profile, with a range of toppings and accompaniments available. Notably, it is not uncommon for individuals to opt for Feta cheese as a topping, while others may prefer honey as a complement to the dish.

Hong Kong

Hong Kong-style French toast is typically prepared by combining multiple slices of bread with peanut butter or fruit jam filling, then dipping in beaten egg and deep frying. It is served with butter, and topped with golden syrup or honey. It is a typical offering in cha chaan teng (Hong Kong-style diners or teahouses). Other types of filling that can be found are meat floss, kaya jam, ham, or beef satay.

India
In India, Bombay toast is a dish sold on the "streets of Mumbai" by hawkers and vendors, Bombay toast is also called Sweet French Bread.

Norway
In Norway, Arme Riddere (Poor Knights). Once only a dessert dish, it is now eaten for brunch or breakfast. Most common spices are cinnamon and cardamom.

Romania
In Romania, it is known as frigănele and, almost always, served as a savory dish, and, often enough, without milk, although milk can be requested at most dinners.

Singapore
French toast is a familiar menu item in the hawker centres of Singapore, where it is often part of a breakfast set with soft-boiled eggs or coconut jam (kaya).

Spain
Torrija is a similar recipe traditionally prepared in Spain for Lent and Holy Week. It is usually made by soaking stale bread in milk or wine with honey and spices. It is dipped in beaten egg and fried with olive oil. This cooking technique breaks down the fibres of the bread and results in a pastry with a crispy outside and smooth inside. It is often sprinkled with cinnamon as a final touch.

Torrijas or torrejas were first mentioned by the Spanish composer, poet and playwright Juan del Encina (1468–1533) in his Cancionero, published in 1496. "Anda acá pastor" has the verse "En cantares nuevos/ gocen sus orejas,/ miel y muchos huevos/ para hacer torrejas,/ aunque sin dolor/ parió al Redentor".

The Netherlands  
In The Netherlands, French Toast is called wentelteefjes, verloren brood (lost bread), or gewonnen brood (reclaimed bread). It is a sweet breakfast dish that can also be eaten as an afternoon treat or evening dessert. The Dutch version of this dish often uses sugar with cinnamon instead of plain sugar. Wentelteefjes are often associated with childhood, where a grandmother provides her grandchildren with a luxury special sweet breakfast on special occasions.

United Kingdom
In the UK, it is commonly known as French toast, and sometimes eggy bread or Gypsy toast, served as both a sweet and savory dish.

United States
French toast was popularly served in railroad dining cars of the early and mid-20th century. The Santa Fe  was especially known for its French toast, and most of the railroads provided recipes for these and other dining car offerings to the public as a promotional feature.

New Orleans
In New Orleans Louisiana Creole cuisine, French toast is known as pain perdu and is most commonly served as a breakfast dish. The recipe calls for New Orleans-style French bread; the batter is an egg-based custard that may include spirits. Common toppings include cane syrup, strongly flavored honey, or fruit syrups; a dusting of powdered sugar is also traditional.

See also

 Egg in the basket
 List of bread dishes
 List of breakfast foods
 List of brunch foods
 List of egg dishes
 Monte Cristo sandwich
 Milk toast

References

Further reading

External links

Egg dishes
Bread dishes
Toast dishes
Desserts
Roman cuisine
French cuisine
Christmas food
Romani cuisine
American breakfast foods